Lake Evijärvi is a lake of Finland in Evijärvi, Southern Ostrobothnia region. The lake is part of Ähtävänjoki  basin.

See also
List of lakes in Finland

References
 Finnish Environment Institute: Lakes in Finland
 Opetuskalvot 

Evijärvi
Lakes of Finland